Stenoporpia pulchella is a species of geometrid moth in the family Geometridae. It is found in North America.

The MONA or Hodges number for Stenoporpia pulchella is 6455.

Subspecies
These two subspecies belong to the species Stenoporpia pulchella:
 Stenoporpia pulchella coolidgearia Dyar, 1923
 Stenoporpia pulchella pulchella

References

Further reading

 

Boarmiini
Moths described in 1909
Articles created by Qbugbot